Turner Motorsports may refer to:

Turner Motorsport, an American BMW performance tuning facility and production car racing team 
Turner Scott Motorsports, a NASCAR team a.k.a. Turner Motorsports, 1999–2014